Sofia Sondervan is a Dutch-born American film producer. Currently she is a producer for Dutch Tilt Film. Sofia Sondervan is best known for the 2008 film Cadillac Records, for which she won the Black Reel Award for Best Film in 2009 and which was nominated for a Golden Globe and 7 NAACP Awards.

She is a member of the Producers Guild as well on the committee of the Gotham Awards.

Filmography

As producer
 The Letter Room (2020) Producer
London Town (2016) Producer
 Urge (2015) Co-Producer
 The Man Who Knew Infinity (2016)
 Bringing Up bobby (2011)
 Cadillac Records (2008)
 Feel the Noise (2007)
 The King (2005)
 Rick (2005)
 The Hebrew Hammer (2003)
 Party Monster (2003)
 Je maintiendrai (short film) (1995)

As director
 Je maintiendrai (short film) (1995)

As writer
 Je maintiendrai (short film) (1995)

Awards

References

External links
Sofia Sondervan Official Website 

Living people
New York University alumni
Year of birth missing (living people)